Luigi Cadorna was an Italian  light cruiser, which served in the Regia Marina during World War II; named after Italian Field Marshal Luigi Cadorna who was commander in Chief of the Italian Army during World War I.

History 
Luigi Cadorna was launched on 30 September 1931. During her early service she did operations in the Spanish Civil War. In April 1939 she participated in the occupation of Albania.

World War II 
When World War II broke out she was a part of the 4th Cruiser Division and started laying mines on 9 June 1940 near the island of Lampedusa. A month later she was present in the Battle of Calabria where she avoided a submarine torpedo attack, engaged enemy aircraft and assisted her sister ship , which had boiler problems.

However, due to her relatively weak design and light armor, she went into reserve from 12 February 1941. The cruiser re-entered service when supplying of the Axis army in North Africa became more important. Luigi Cadorna provided distant cover for convoys headed towards North Africa. Occasionally she sortied with the fleet to intercept British convoys to Malta. In the period of November/December 1941 she was also used as a transport, transporting fuel and ammunition to Libya.

From January 1942 she was transferred to Pola, where she was employed in a training role. After a short refit in May/June 1943, she joined the 8th Cruiser Division on 14 June.

Between 24–30 June she transported troops to Albania, and on 3 July she was transferred to Taranto, from whence, in August, she made five minelaying sorties to lay defensive fields in the Gulf of Taranto along with the light cruiser .

At the armistice on 8 September 1943 she was at Taranto, but she sailed to Malta on the next day to surrender together with the fleet. She remained there until transferred to Alexandria on 14 September. After a brief stay she returned to Taranto in October. For the remainder of the war she was used as a transport ship for the Allies and for the repatriation of Italian troops.

After the Peace Treaty on 10 February 1947, she was one of the few ships to remain in the Italian Navy. Because of her age and condition she was only used as a training ship until stricken in May 1951 and subsequently scrapped.

Citations

References

External links
Luigi Cadorna Marina Militare website

Cadorna-class cruisers
Ships built in Trieste
1931 ships
World War II cruisers of Italy
Cruisers of the Italian Navy
Cold War cruisers of Italy
Ships built by Cantieri Riuniti dell'Adriatico